Paratheocris is a genus of longhorn beetles of the subfamily Lamiinae, containing the following species:

 Paratheocris haltica (Jordan, 1903)
 Paratheocris lunulata (Hintz, 1919)
 Paratheocris mimetica (Aurivillius, 1907)
 Paratheocris nigromaculata (Breuning, 1938)
 Paratheocris obliqua (Jordan, 1903)
 Paratheocris olivacea Breuning, 1938
 Paratheocris similis Breuning, 1938
 Paratheocris viridis (Aurivillius, 1907)

References

Theocridini